Ines Papert (born 5 April 1974) is a German alpine climber, and a world champion ice and mixed climber best known for her ice climbing competition awards and difficult alpine ascents. She has made a number of first ascents and has broken difficulty grade milestones for female climbers.

Early life
Ines Papert grew up in the northern Saxon town of Bad Düben, Germany. She comes from a musical family and plays piano and saxophone. After completing her education as a physiotherapist, Papert left her home in Saxony, Germany in 1993 and moved to Berchtesgaden, Bavaria in the Alps. It was only there that she discovered her interest in the mountains. She began to learn about hiking, biking, and skiing before moving on to mountain climbing. Her first major mountain climb was in 1996 on Watzmann (2713m), which is the highest peak which is entirely within Germany.

Climbing career
In 2006, she won the overall Ice Climbing World Cup, and over the years she won the world cup three more times. On 13 November 2013 she made the first ascent of Likhu Chuli (6719m) in Nepal and reached the summit by herself. Ines was the first woman to climb the mixed climbing grade of M11.

Significant Climbs 
 1997 Ascension of the Aconcagua
 1998 Peru Expedition with the ascents of Nevado Pisco, Nevado Alpamayo, Nevado Artesonraju and Torre del Paron
 1999 Yosemite El Capitan; the route "The Nose"
 2001 her first rock climbing route in the French eighth grade
 2002 different (ice) climbing routes
 2003 Eiger North Face, first red point ascent of the route "Symphonie de Liberte" (then the most difficult route on the wall) and Eiskletterrouten (Mixed) to degree (M 11)
 2004 first rock climbing route in French degrees 8b "shadow king" in the Bavarian Alps
 2006 redpoint climb "Pellisier" (in French degrees 8b) in the north wall of the Cima Grande.
 2007, the first repetition of the hitherto well hardest mixed route in the world Law and Order (M 13)
 2009 first ascent of the route "Power of Silence" '(7c +, 11 pitches) by the South Face of Middle Huey Spire in Canada.
 2009 Ascent of the Canadian "Lotus Flower Tower" in the "Onsight" over the Southeast Pillar (6b)
 2010 first ascent of the mixed routes "Triple X" (VIII, 8) on Ben Nevis and "Bavarinthia" (IX, 9) at the Cairngorms, Coire an Lochain in Scotland
 2011 "Super Cirill" 9 Seachängeroute at the Parete di Sonlerto (Ticino) in grade 8a / 8a +
 2011 "Great Walls of China" 600 meters on Mount Kyzyl Asker in Kyrgyzstan ; Difficulty: ABO, WI 7+, M 7
 2012 repetition of "Illuminati" M11 +, WI 6+, near St. Ulrich, Tyrol
 2013 first ascent of Likhu Chuli I in Nepal, which she climbed solo.
 2013 first ascent of the route "Azazar" (8a, 9 pitches) in the south-west wall of Tadrarate in Morocco.
 2014 First red-point tour of the route "Without smoke you will die" (8a, 17 ropes) on the north face of the Great Trenches in Italy.
 2015 Second ascent of the mixed route "Holy Grail" (M 12), (W15) 
 2016 Fifth ascent of "Riders on the Storm" VI 5.12d A3, the "Torre Central" ( Torres del Paine National Park ), Patagonia
 2016, October. Successful climb of the difficult southeast face of the Kyzyl Asker 5,842m up a new route Lost in China WI5+ M6 1,200m. To acclimatize, she made the second ascent and first free ascent of Border Control WI5 M7 650m on Great Wall of China 5,000m. With Luka Lindič.

Competitions 
She has won more than 20 World Cup ice-climbing events.

Personal
She now lives in Bayerisch Gmain. On 22 August 2000, she became a mother to her son Emanuel.

Bibliography 
 Ines Papert: "Vertical: Life on the Steepest Faces" . Delius Klasing, Hamburg 2012

References

External links 
 Homepage
 Ines Papert on Camilotto Pellesier
 Interview with Ines Papert

1974 births
Ice climbers
Female climbers
Living people
German mountain climbers
People from Wittenberg
German women non-fiction writers